The Osing or Using are indigenous ethnic group native to easternmost part of the Java island (especially in Banyuwangi), Indonesia. They are the descendants of the people of the ancient Kingdom of Blambangan. The population of Osing people are approximately 400,000 which concentrated in the Banyuwangi Regency of East Java Province.

Demography
The Osing people are settled in several districts in the central and northern regions of Banyuwangi Regency especially in Banyuwangi district, Rogojampi district, Sempu district, Glagah district, Singojuruh district, Giri district, Kalipuro district and Songgon district. The Osing community or also commonly known as Laré  Osing by some circles and as a result of research, are considered as the natives of Banyuwangi Regency, including an area at the easternmost tip of the Java island that is also known as Blambangan Peninsula. This community of people are spread throughout fertile farming villages in the central and eastern regions of Banyuwangi Regency, administratively includes districts such as Giri, Kabat, Glagah, Belimbing Sari, Rogojampi, Sempu, Singojuruh, Songgon, Cluring, Banyuwangi (city), Genteng and Srono. In the four later districts, integration with non-Osing people occurs usually with migrants from western East Java, Central Java including Jogjakarta; which the Osing people refer them as Wong Jawa Kulon (Western Javanese people).

Language

The native language of Osing people is the Osing language, it is categorized as part of the Javanesic language family. Linguistically speaking, this language has been influenced heavily by its sister languages notably the Javanese (mainly eastern dialects) and Balinese. The main factor is probably due to Osing's cultural land which located between the two cultural lands of Javanese and Balinese people.

History
The history of the Osing people dates back to the end of the 15th century, at the time of the fall of Majapahit; to resist conversion to Islam, many of them fled east to Banyuwangi, Bali and Lombok.  Much of Java were converted to Islam by the Muslim Makassars in the 16th century. The remaining Hindu princes from Majapahit established the Kingdom of Blambangan, which stretched from the Blambangan peninsula right up to the Tengger mountains of Central Java. Blambangan held sway for slightly more than two hundred years before they finally surrendered to the second Mataram Sultanate in 1743, and the eventual Islamization of the Osing people. However, the conversion process wasn't complete until the mid-19th century, though small communities of Muslims do pre-exist this date. The cause of the Osing's conversion is that, during the 19th century, when Banyuwangi was still unscathed by the Dutch colony, but knowing that by launching an attack on Banyuwangi, they will lose out in the battle as the Hindu principal puputan was a fight-to-death, (as occurred previously in the Puputan Bayu War or Blambangan War in 1771–1773) the Dutch sent Muslim and Christian missionaries to tame the fighting spirit. Only then Banyuwangi was captured, a long and ambitious dream toward further occupation on Bali was launched by the Dutch.

After the Dutch East India Company conquered the region in 1767, the Dutch settled many Javanese, Madurese and other Muslim migrants to the area.

Religion
The Osings are mostly adherents of Islam, although there are some who still follow Hinduism. Elements of animism can be seen in their religion too. The Osings share a similar culture and spirit with the Balinese, and the Hindus celebrate ceremonies like Nyepi. Just like the Balinese people, the Osing people also share the puputan tradition. It is not uncommon to see mosques and puras (Hindu temples) to be built nearby to each other in Banyuwangi.

Vocation
The main profession of the Osing people are farmers with a small number of them are traders and officers in formal areas of employment such as teachers and local government officials.

Culture

Social stratification
The Osing people differ from the Balinese people in terms of social stratification as the majority of the Osing are Muslims but even the Hindu Osing do not practice the caste system like the Balinese people, even though they are Hindus. This is because of the Islamic influences that is practiced by a significant number of Muslims in their community.

Art
The Osing people's various art forms are unique and contains mystical elements just like their Balinese and Tenggerese relatives. The main art form is their popular version of Gandrung traditional dance., Patrol, Seblang, Angklung, Barong dance, Kuntulan, Kendang Kempul, Janger, Jaranan, Jaran Kincak, Angklung Caruk and Jedor.

Other art forms that are still preserved is the nursery rhyme, especially among school children such as Jamuran and Ojo Rame-Rame. These short poem nursery rhymes in general are used to accompany during children's play. Apart from adding a cheerful atmosphere when children are playing in groups, these nursery rhymes can work to teach positive values in early childhood. Jamuran nursery rhyme teaches about communal work, while Ojo Rame-Rame teaches patriotism.

Customary village
The government of Banyuwangi Regency sees great potential in the culture of the Osing people by establishing Kemiren village in Glagah district as a customary village that preserves the cultural values of the Osing people. Kemiren village is also a tourist destination that is popular among the Banyuwangi people and its surrounding communities. Cultural festivals and annual artistic events are often held in the village.

References

Further reading

External links 
 Ethnologue report
 General ethnic profile
 Wedding Couple of Osing Banyuwangi
 Diverse Indonesia: The Osing people of East Java

Ethnic groups in Indonesia
Hindu ethnic groups
East Java